The Lipomycetaceae are a family of yeasts in the order Saccharomycetales. According to the 2007 Outline of Ascomycota, the family contains five genera; the placement of the genus Kawasakia is uncertain. Species in the family have a widespread distribution, and grow in the soil or in association with insects.

References

Saccharomycetes
Ascomycota families